Trechus komarovi is a species of ground beetle in the Trechinae family. It was described by Belousov in 1990.

References

komarovi
Beetles described in 1990